The Great Twenty-Eight is a compilation album by American musician Chuck Berry, released in 1982 on Chess Records. In 2003, the album was ranked number 21 on Rolling Stone magazine's list of the 500 greatest albums of all time, maintaining the rating in a 2012 revised list, the second-highest ranking compilation on the list after The Sun Sessions by Elvis Presley.  It was ranked number 51 in the 2020 reboot of the list.

Out of print for many years, the compilation was reissued on vinyl by Geffen Records on August 4, 2017, five months after his death. All of its 28 tracks can be found on the 2000 Anthology two-disc set. Geffen later announced a 'Super Deluxe Edition' vinyl reissue, containing the original album, a new compilation 'More Great Chuck Berry', a live album 'Oh Yeah! Live In Detroit', recorded in 1963, and a 10" EP called 'Berry Christmas'.

A survey of Berry's first decade of recording on Chess Records, it contains 21 singles along with six of their B-sides and one album track from Chuck Berry in London. Of those singles, eleven were Top 10 hits on the Billboard R&B singles chart and ten were Top 40 hits on the Billboard Hot 100.

Track listing

Personnel
 Chuck Berry – vocals, guitars
 Matt "Guitar" Murphy, Jimmy Rogers, Hubert Sumlin – electric guitars
 Johnnie Johnson, Lafayette Leake, Otis Spann, Paul Williams – piano
 Willie Dixon – bass
 Reggie Boyd, George Smith – bass
 Fred Below, Ebby Hardy, Odie Payne, Jasper Thomas – drums
 Jerome Green – maracas
 Gene Barge, L.C. Davis, James Robinson – saxophones
 Martha Berry, Etta James, The Ecuadors, The Marquees, The Moonglows – backing vocals

References

External links
 

1982 greatest hits albums
Chuck Berry compilation albums
Albums produced by Leonard Chess
Albums produced by Phil Chess
Chess Records compilation albums